Highway 28 is an east-west highway on the northern part of Vancouver Island, within the Strathcona Regional District.  It is the main link to the northern part of Strathcona Provincial Park and the remote logging communities of Gold River and Tahsis, on the northwest coast of the Island.  The highway first opened in 1970.  Before the section of Highway 19 from Campbell River to Port Hardy was opened in 1979, Highway 28 acted as the main access to Port Hardy and various other communities on the northern tip of the Island (in the Regional District of Mount Waddington), aided by a system of local logging roads leading from the highway to the various north Island communities.

History
Originally a logging road that connected to Highway 19, a few kilometres west of Campbell River, the road split, one alignment going south into Strathcona Park, and the other going west to Gold River, which looped north of Upper Campbell Lake. By 1970 a paved Highway was built over most of the logging road. Abandoning the west logging road, the new highway continued south, reaching the south end of Upper Campbell Lake. A bridge was built over the river between Buttle Lake and Upper Campbell Lake and a stretch of highway was added to where the west logging road connected. The rest of the road that lead to Gold River was subsequently paved. The access to Port Hardy, however, was left unchanged until 1976 when Highway 19 was extended north.

Route details

Highway 28's total length is 99 km (62 mi).  Starting in Gold River at the shore of Muchalat Inlet, Highway 28 follows the Gold and Heber Rivers northeast for 24 km (15 mi) before entering Strathcona Provincial Park.  The highway winds its way east through the park, following the Elk River, for 17 km (11 mi), then hugs Upper Campbell Lake for another 11 km (7 mi) to its junction with the road to Westmin Mines. 37 km later (23 mi), the highway enters the city limits of Campbell River, finally terminating 10 km (6 mi) later at a junction with Highways 19 and 19A, in the northern part of the city.

028
Campbell River, British Columbia
Transport on Vancouver Island